Laufferiella is a genus of flies in the family Tachinidae.

Species
L. elegans Villeneuve, 1929
L. steini Zimin, 1931

References

Tachininae
Tachinidae genera
Taxa named by Joseph Villeneuve de Janti